KyivNotKiev is an online campaign started by the Ukrainian Ministry of Foreign Affairs (MFA) together with the 15 member centre for strategic communications "StratCom Ukraine" on 2 October 2018. Its goal was to persuade English-language media and organizations to exclusively use Kyiv (derived from the Ukrainian language name ) instead of Kiev (derived from the Russian language name ) as the name of the Ukrainian capital. It is a part of the wider CorrectUA campaign. It is also part of a global trend of city name changes.

The organization intends to internationally assert a Ukrainian identity and help shed linguistic relics of the Russian Empire and Soviet Union by promoting the exclusive use of Ukrainian-language transliterations for Ukrainian place names. The campaign is run by the Department of Public Diplomacy of the MFA. 

The transliteration Kyiv was legally mandated by the Ukrainian government in 1995. The transliteration was approved by the Tenth United Nations Conference on Standardization of Geographical Names in 2012, but did not catch on internationally. Prior to 2019, there were few cases of organizations switching to the "Kyiv" spelling, because the issue was imposed by nationalists on purpose. After the Russo-Ukrainian War began in 2014, many Western media outlets opted to switch spellings. The war and international political opinions only intensified with Russia's invasion of Ukraine in 2022.

CorrectUA campaign  
The "KyivNotKiev" campaign is part of the broader "CorrectUA" campaign, which advocates a change of name in English; not only for Kyiv, but also for other Ukrainian cities whose English names are derived from their Russian spellings. Examples of settlement names derived from Russian include: Odessa instead of Odesa, Kharkov instead of Kharkiv, Lvov instead of Lviv, Nikolaev instead of Mykolaiv, and Rovno instead of Rivne. In English,  was used in print as early as 1804 in John Cary's "New map of Europe, from the latest authorities" which appeared in Cary's New Universal Atlas published in London, as well as in Mary Holderness's travelogue New Russia: Journey from Riga to the Crimea by way of Kiev, published in 1823. The Oxford English Dictionary included Kiev in a quotation by 1883, and Kyiv in 2018. Transliterations based on Russian names became common practice because of aggressive Russification policies from the Russian Imperial and later Soviet governments.

The campaign also includes advice on the usage of the definite article (the) before the name of the country, i.e. "the Ukraine". The definite article is rarely found before the names of independent states, most stemming from the name either being a noun-adjective term or from a geographical region; for Ukraine, the addition of "the" is hypothesized to either derive from its time as the Ukrainian Soviet Socialist Republic (compare with the Russian Federation) or due to the word supposedly originally meaning "borderland", hence saying "the Ukraine" as meaning "the borderlands" (compare with The Netherlands). However, many Ukrainians regard the use of "the Ukraine" as tantamount to questioning Ukrainian sovereignty, especially after the beginning of the Russian military intervention into Ukraine. Others hold that this campaign is nothing more than populism and was started to make it look like something was being done to divert attention from more important problems.

KyivNotKiev campaign

Beginning of the KyivNotKiev campaign 
The "KyivNotKiev" campaign began with a fortnight-long "marathon" where every one or two days the MFA published the title of foreign news outlets. Ukrainians would, en masse, request them on social networks to use Kyiv instead of Kiev, which was also followed by numerous Ukrainian social networks users putting "#KyivNotKiev" frames on their avatars. Ten of the most influential (in the opinion of the MFA) English language global news outlets were affected: Reuters, CNN, BBC News, Al Jazeera, Daily Mail, The Washington Post, The New York Times, The Guardian, The Wall Street Journal and Euronews. Among the top Ukrainian officials who took part were: Minister of Healthcare, Ulana Suprun; Representative of Ukraine at the Council of Europe, Dmytro Kuleba; and the Member of the Verkhovna Rada, Yehor Soboliev. The campaign won the support of thousands of Ukrainians, and the hashtag "#KyivNotKiev" was seen by more 10 million social network users. During or shortly after this "marathon", the BBC and The Guardian started using Kyiv. Later, the campaign shifted its attention to foreign airports, which used Kiev almost exclusively.

Results of the KyivNotKiev campaign 
After the campaign began, the name Kyiv became more common on such Anglophone outlets as the BBC, The Guardian, Associated Press, The Wall Street Journal, The Globe and Mail, The Washington Post, Financial Times, The Economist, The Daily Telegraph, The New York Times and other foreign media. It was also adopted by some international organizations.

In June 2019, at the request of the United States Department of State, the Embassy of Ukraine to the United States, and Ukrainian organizations in America, the name Kyiv was officially adopted by the United States Board on Geographic Names as the only correct one, which resulted in the federal government of the United States solely using 'Kyiv'. Before that, both names were used.

One of the objectives of the campaign was to convince international airports around the world to switch from Kiev to Kyiv. Previously, most airports refused to do so, saying that in lists of the International Air Transport Association (IATA) and International Civil Aviation Organization (ICAO) the name Kiev was specified. However, in October 2019, IATA, following the decision of the U.S. Board on Geographic Names, switched to Kyiv. Since the campaign's launch, 63 airports and 3 airlines worldwide (as of January 2020) have begun using the name Kyiv, even before it was adopted by IATA. Among them were Toronto Pearson, Luton, Manchester, Frankfurt, and Josep Tarradellas Barcelona–El Prat.

In September 2020, the English Wikipedia switched from using Kiev to Kyiv.

As of 2022, the remaining major news websites that continue to use "Kiev" are mostly Russian-linked sites funded by the Kremlin, such as the English service of TASS, Sputnik News and RT. These channels also habitually use Russian transliteration for all Ukrainian proper names, such as Kharkov, Chernigov, Krivoy Rog, current Ukrainian president Vladimir Zelensky and former Ukrainian president Pyotr Poroshenko.

Effective in non-English countries 
On 2 March 2022, the Ministry of Foreign Affairs in South Korea announced to switch Korean translation of Kyiv from  that derived from Russian, to  derived from Ukrainian.

On 31 March 2022, the Japanese Ministry of Foreign Affairs announced to switch Japanese translation of Kyiv from  that derived from Russian, to  derived from Ukrainian. This had been requested by Embassy of Ukraine in Japan in 2019.

See also
 Name of Kyiv
 List of city name changes
 Derussification in Ukraine

References

External links
 Map of organizations which switched to "Kyiv" in Google Maps
 List of organizations which switched to "Kyiv"

 Kyiv Not Kiev page on Facebook
 CorrectUA page on Facebook
 CorrectUA page on Twitter
 Hashtag #KyivNotKiev on Twitter
 Hashtag #KyivNotKiev on Facebook
 Hashtag #CorrectUA on Twitter
 Hashtag #CorrectUA on Facebook

2018 in politics
2018 in Ukraine
City name changes in Ukraine
Culture in Kyiv
Derussification
Political campaigns
Politics of Ukraine
Ukrainian nationalism